Aloe butiabana  is a species of Aloe native to western Uganda.

References

butiabana
Plants described in 2011
Flora of Uganda